Ángel Laferrara (born 27 March 1917, date of death unknown) was an Argentine footballer. He was a talented striker.

Career 
Laferrara started his career in 1936, playing for Estudiantes de La Plata, where he scored 86 goals in 78 games. His performance was noted by Boca Juniors, who bought him in 1942. He only played 15 games in Boca, scoring 8 goals. At the end of the season he was sent, on loan, to Club Atlético Peñarol as part of the transfer fee for Severino Varela. He played well in Peñarol, scoring twice in the 1943 Torneo de Honor final, against Nacional. At the end of the season, again, he was sent to Ferro Carril Oeste, where he scored 7 games in 18 games. In 1945, he played for Nueva Chicago, in the Primera B, Argentina Second Division. In 1946, he moved to Chile, where he played for Unión Española. He retired in 1949, playing for Argentino de Quilmes.

He played in six matches for the Argentina national football team from 1940 to 1942. He was also part of Argentina's squad for the 1942 South American Championship.

References

External links
 

1917 births
Year of death missing
Argentine footballers
Argentina international footballers
Place of birth missing
Association football forwards